211th Street (Lincoln Highway) is a commuter rail station along the Main Branch of the Metra Electric line in Olympia Fields, Illinois. This station actually straddles three cities. The northern part of the platform and northern parking lot lies in Olympia Fields, the eastern parking lot in Park Forest, and the western parking lot and bus station in Matteson.

The station is named after both of the names for US 30 in Park Forest; Lincoln Highway, and 211th Street. The only other station to be given two street names in one is 147th Street (Sibley Boulevard). 211th Street is built on elevated tracks near the embankment of a bridge over US 30. This bridge also carries the Amtrak line that runs parallel to it, carrying the City of New Orleans, Illini, and Saluki trains. Parking is available on westbound US 30 between the railroad bridge and Olympian Way, and along eastbound US 30 on the southeast corner of the bridge, which is accessible from Homan Avenue via Indiana Street in Park Forest.

Bus connections

Pace

 357 Lincoln Highway

References

External links 

Lincoln Highway entrance from Google Maps Street View

Metra stations in Illinois
Former Illinois Central Railroad stations
Railway stations in Cook County, Illinois